Brian K. Smith is Senior Associate Dean of Academic Affairs and Professor in the College of Computing and Informatics at Drexel University. He also has an appointment in its School of Education's learning technologies program. In 2017-18, he was on rotation as a program officer at the National Science Foundation in the Division of Research on Learning.

Academic career 
Smith was an assistant & associate professor of Media Arts and Sciences in the MIT Media Laboratory from 1997-2002, where he conducted research on software for use in education, particularly software incorporating multimedia with an emphasis on visual features and design. His research during this time covered different aspects of education, including  music, biology, and history. His research during this time also included  the potential benefits of a multimedia approach to patient counseling and education.

Smith was an associate professor of Information Sciences and Technology and Education at Pennsylvania State University., where he was the principal investigator for its Medical Informatics Research Initiative and Director of its Solutions Institute.

At Pennsylvania State, he continued educational multimedia software research, branching out into studies of physically active computer gaming and Fantasy basketball. He was also a member of the panel that produced the National Research Council report, Learning Science in Informal Environments: People, Places, and Pursuits.

Selected publications
Smith, B. K., Frost, J., Albayrak, M., and Sudhakar, R. (2007). "Integrating glucometers and digital photography as experience capture tools to enhance patient understanding and communication of diabetes self-management practices." Personal and Ubiquitous Computing, 11(4): 273-286. 
Smith, B.K., Frost, J., Albayrak, M., & Sudhakar, R. (2006). "Facilitating narrative medical discussions of type 1 diabetes with computer visualizations and photography." Patient Education and Counseling, 64: 313-321.
Smith, B.K., Sharma, P., & Hooper, P. (2006). "Decision making in online fantasy sports communities." Interactive Technology & Smart Education, 4: 347-360.
Smith, B.K. (2006). "Design and computational flexibility." Digital Creativity, 17(2): 65-72.
Smith, B.K.  (2005). "Physical fitness in virtual worlds."  IEEE Computer, 38(10): 101-103. 
Smith, B.K. & Reiser, B.J. (2005). "Explaining behavior using video for observational inquiry and theory articulation." The Journal of the Learning Sciences, 14(3): 315-360. 
Smith, B.K. & Blankinship, E.. (2000). "Justifying imagery: Multimedia support for learning through explanation."  IBM Systems Journal, 39(3&4): 749-767. 
Smith, B.K., Blankinship, E., & Lackner, T. (2000). "Annotation and education." IEEE MultiMedia 7(2): 84-89. 
Reiser, B.J., Tabak, I., Sandoval, W.A., Smith, B.K., Steinmuller, F., & Leone, A.J. (2001). "BGuILE: Strategic and conceptual scaffolds for scientific inquiry in biology classrooms." In S.M. Carver & D. Klahr (eds.), Cognition and Instruction: Twenty Five Years of Progress (pp. 263–305). Mahwah, NJ: Lawrence Erlbaum Associates.

References

Year of birth missing (living people)
Living people
Northwestern University alumni
Pennsylvania State University faculty
UCLA Henry Samueli School of Engineering and Applied Science alumni